Garrone is an Italian surname. Notable people with the surname include:

Andrés Garrone (born 1976), Argentinean  footballer
Gabriel-Marie Garrone (1901–1994), French Cardinal of the Roman Catholic Church
Laura Garrone (born 1967), Italian former professional tennis player
María Virginia Garrone (born 1978), Argentine former swimmer
Matteo Garrone (born 1968), Italian film director
Nelda Garrone (c. 1880 – ?), Italian operatic mezzo-soprano
Riccardo Garrone (disambiguation), multiple people
Sergio Garrone (born 1925), Italian director, screenwriter and film producer
Virginia Galante Garrone (1906-1998), Italian writer

See also
16997 Garrone, main-belt asteroid

Italian-language surnames